Manila Esposito (born 2 November 2006) is an Italian artistic gymnast. She is a two-time medalist in the FIG World Cup series. She competed at the 2022 World Championships.

Career

2022 
Esposito competed at the DTB Pokal Mixed Cup and won the bronze medal with the Italian team behind the United States and Germany. She then competed at the City of Jesolo Trophy where she finished tenth in the all-around with a total score of 51.200. She won the all-around title at the Joaquim Blume Memorial with a total score of 53.300. She won the all-around bronze medal at the Italian Championships behind Martina Maggio and Alice D'Amato. In the event finals, she won the gold medal on the vault, the silver medal on the balance beam, the bronze medal on the uneven bars, and she placed fourth on the floor exercise. She was then selected to compete at the World Championships alongside Maggio, D'Amato, Giorgia Villa, and Veronica Mandriota. The team qualified for the team final where they finished fifth.

2023 
Esposito competed at the Cottbus World Cup on the vault and floor exercise. In the vault final, she won the gold medal by competing a Yurchenko 1.5 and a Podkopayeva for a 13.233 average. She won a silver medal in the floor final behind Japan's Kokufugata Azuki.

References 

2006 births
Living people
Italian female artistic gymnasts
Sportspeople from Campania